Valley Stream Union Free School District 24 is located one-half hour or less from Aqueduct Raceway, Belmont Park, Eisenhower Park, Hempstead Lake State Park, boating and swimming facilities, Westbury Music Fair, the Nassau Veteran’s Memorial Coliseum, as well as the in-town convenience Hendrickson Park and the Valley Stream Village Green.

On average, Valley Stream Union Free School District 24 is better than the state average in quality. The District motto is "We Know We Can".

Schools
The district operates three schools:

Elementary schools
Brooklyn Avenue School (K-6)
Robert W. Carbonaro School (K-6)
William L. Buck School (K-6)

Middle schools
none, see Valley Stream Central High School District

High schools
none, see Valley Stream Central High School District

Performance
In 2003, 92% of students tested at acceptable levels 3 or 4 in Elementary-Level Social Studies. In 2008, student test scores exceeded the state average in all grades and tested subject areas of New York State standardized tests.

See also
Valley Stream 13 Union Free School District
Valley Stream 30 Union Free School District

External links
District Website
New York State School Boards Association

References

Valley Stream, New York
School districts in New York (state)
Education in Nassau County, New York